Saurabh Mittal (born 1973) is a Singapore-based Indian businessman, entrepreneur, investor, and philanthropist. He is the founder and chairman of Mission Holdings, a private investment holding company.

Education 

Mittal attended the Indian Institute of Technology in Delhi for a BS in Electrical engineering, where he was the Best Graduating Student. Mittal also holds an MBA from Harvard Business School and graduated as a Baker Scholar.

Career 

In 1999, Mittal co-founded Indiabulls, a financial services and real estate conglomerate in India, with his undergraduate classmates from the Indian Institute of Technology. He served as Vice chairman of its board of directors until he stepped down in 2014.

He later joined Farallon Capital as an investment associate in 2001 before he became a full partner at Noonday Capital, an affiliate of Farallon, in 2005. Mittal left both Farallon and Noonday in 2011.

While studying for his MBA at Harvard Business School, Mittal befriended Chatri Sityodtong, and the pair later established martial arts promotion ONE Championship in 2011. Mittal was appointed Vice Chairman of the company in 2018.

In 2011, Mittal founded Incedo Inc. with operating partners to focus on data and analytics in the US. In 2017, Nitin Seth took over from Mittal as Chief Executive Officer of Incedo, while Mittal remained as chairman.

In 2014, Mittal set up Mission Holdings, a private investment holding company with a focus on financial services, media, real estate, and technology, and he is its chairman and sole shareholder.

In 2022, Mittal was ranked as the 46th richest person in Singapore with a net worth of US$900 million.

Philanthropy 

Mittal has served on Harvard Business School's Advisory Board, is a Founder and Trustee of Plaksha University, and is a Founder and Board Member of the IIT Delhi Endowment Fund. He is also member of the governing body of Parivaar, a charitable organization focused on the care and development of highly-vulnerable children, and a member of the Founder's Circle of Avasara Academy, a school dedicated to developing young Indian women. In 2020, Mittal donated RS. 10 Crore towards building the Mittal Sports Centre at IIT Delhi.

Personal life 
Mittal has three children.

Honors 
Distinguished Alumnus Award 2017, Indian Institute of Technology, Delhi.

See also 
 Chatri Sityodtong
 ONE Championship

References 

Living people
Indian expatriates in Singapore
IIT Delhi alumni
Harvard Business School alumni
1973 births
ONE Championship